Alex Alves  may refer to:
Alex Alves (footballer, 1974–2012), Brazilian football striker
Alex Alves (footballer, born 1975), Brazilian football manager and former striker
Alex Alves (footballer, born 1981), Brazilian football midfielder
Alex Alves (footballer, born 1986), Brazilian football goalkeeper
Alex Alves (footballer, born 1992), Brazilian football defender